The Chota Formation is an Early Campanian to Late Eocene geologic formation of the Cajamarca and western Amazonas Region in northern Peru. Dinosaur remains are among the fossils that have been recovered from the formation, although none have yet been referred to a specific genus. The formation was formerly named Bagua Formation.

See also 
 List of dinosaur-bearing rock formations
 List of stratigraphic units with indeterminate dinosaur fossils

References

Bibliography

Further reading 
 
 
 T. Mourier, P. Bengtson, M. Bonhomme, E. Buge, H. Cappetta, J.-Y. Crochet, M. Feist, K. F. Hirsch, E. Jaillard, G. Laubacher, J. P. Lefranc, M. Moullade, C. Noblet, D. Pons, J. Rey, B. Sigé, Y. Tambareau and P. Taquet. 1988. The Upper Cretaceous–Lower Tertiary marine to continental transition in the Bagua Basin, northern Peru: paleontology, biostratigraphy, radiometry, correlations. Newsletters on Stratigraphy 19(3):143-177

Geologic formations of Peru
Upper Cretaceous Series of South America
Cretaceous Peru
Campanian Stage
Maastrichtian Stage of South America
Cretaceous–Paleogene boundary
Paleogene Peru
Paleocene Series of South America
Danian Stage
Selandian Stage
Thanetian Stage
Eocene Series of South America
Ypresian Stage
Lutetian Stage
Bartonian Stage
Shale formations
Sandstone formations
Fluvial deposits
Shallow marine deposits
Evaporite deposits
Fossiliferous stratigraphic units of South America
Paleontology in Peru